
This is a list of the 35 players who earned their 2005 PGA Tour card through Q School in 2004.

Players in yellow are 2005 PGA Tour rookies.

2005 Results

*PGA Tour rookie in 2005
T = Tied 
Green background indicates the player retained his PGA Tour card for 2006 (finished inside the top 125). 
Yellow background indicates the player did not retain his PGA Tour card for 2006, but retained conditional status (finished between 126-150). 
Red background indicates the player did not retain his PGA Tour card for 2006 (finished outside the top 150).

Winners on the PGA Tour in 2005

Runners-up on the PGA Tour in 2005

See also
2004 Nationwide Tour graduates

References
Graduates
Player profiles
Money list

PGA Tour Qualifying School
PGA Tour Qualifying School Graduates
PGA Tour Qualifying School Graduates